This is a list of notably short political appointments by Donald Trump, the 45th president of the United States.

The turnover rate in the Trump administration has been noted by various publications. Several Trump appointees, including Michael Flynn, Reince Priebus, Anthony Scaramucci, and Tom Price, have among the shortest service tenures in the history of their respective offices.

This list excludes political appointees, White House staff and other officials of the federal government from previous administrations who left or were dismissed from their positions under Trump (such as James Comey or Sally Yates).

List

See also
List of Trump administration dismissals and resignations
List of Donald Trump nominees who have withdrawn

Notes

References

Presidency of Donald Trump
Donald Trump
Trump administration cabinet members
2010s politics-related lists
Trump appointments
 Short-term
Donald Trump-related lists
Trump administration controversies